The Arenele BNR are a complex of tennis venues located in  Bucharest, Romania. The central court has a capacity of 5,000 seats and the whole facility contains 11 courts. They are named after the National Bank of Romania (BNR).

They host the Bucharest Open (part of the WTA Tour and played annually in July after Wimbledon).

They also hosted the traditional Romanian Open, also known as the BRD Năstase Țiriac Trophy, that was part of the ATP World Tour for 24 editions.

See also
 List of tennis stadiums by capacity

References

External links
Davis Cup Final 1972 (Romania-USA)
Central court imagine 1
Central court imagine 2

Sports venues in Bucharest
Tennis venues in Romania
1972 Davis Cup